Gustavus Adolphus College is a private liberal arts college in St. Peter, Minnesota. It was founded in 1862 by Swedish Americans led by Eric Norelius and is affiliated with the Evangelical Lutheran Church in America. Gustavus gets its name from Gustavus Adolphus, the King of Sweden from 1611 to 1632. Its residential campus includes a 125-acre arboretum, a tall-grass prairie, wetlands, coniferous forests, and deciduous woods.

History

Founding

The predecessor to the college was founded in 1862 as a Lutheran parochial school in Red Wing by Eric Norelius. The school offered classes for grade-school children; collegiate courses were not offered until nearly a decade later, but the college uses the earlier date as the year it was founded. Originally named Minnesota Elementarskola (elementary school in Swedish), it moved the following year to East Union, an unincorporated town in Dahlgren Township. In 1865, on the 1,000th anniversary of the death of St. Ansgar, known as the "Apostle of the North", the institution was renamed and incorporated as St. Ansgar's Academy.

Renaming
In April 1873, the college was to be renamed Gustavus Adolphus Literary & Theological Institute in honor of King Gustavus Adolphus of Sweden once the final location and buildings were secured. A delegation of residents from St. Peter won favor from the founders to relocate there as a result of an economic crisis and the town's offer of $10,000 and donation of acreage for a larger campus. Courses were initially to start in the fall of 1875 but slow progress on the construction of the first campus building, Old Main, delayed the opening. On October 16, 1876, Gustavus Adolphus College opened at the location that still stands today. It is the oldest of several Lutheran colleges founded in Minnesota. It was founded as a college of the Augustana Evangelical Lutheran Church. In 1962 it became affiliated with the Lutheran Church in America, when the Augustana Synod merged into that body. The Lutheran Church in America merged in 1988 to create the Evangelical Lutheran Church in America.

World War II
During World War II, Gustavus Adolphus College was one of 131 colleges and universities nationally that took part in the V-12 Navy College Training Program which offered students a path to a Navy commission.

Founding of the Nobel Conference
The annual Nobel Conference was established in the mid-1960s when college officials asked the Nobel Foundation for permission to name the new science building the Alfred Nobel Hall of Science as a memorial to the Swedish inventor Alfred Nobel. Permission was granted, and the facility's dedication ceremony in 1963 included officials from the Nobel Foundation and 26 Nobel Laureates. Following the 1963 Nobel Prize ceremonies in Stockholm, college representatives met with Nobel Foundation officials, asking them to endorse an annual science conference at the college and to allow use of the Nobel name to establish credibility and high standards. At the urging of several prominent Nobel laureates, the foundation granted the request, and the first conference was held at the college in January 1965.

Presidents 
 Eric Norelius, 1862–63, Founder
 Andrew Jackson, principal 1863–73, acting principal 1874–76
 John J. Frodeen, principal 1873–74
 Jonas P. Nyquist, 1876–81
 Matthias Wahlstrom, 1881–1904
 Peter A. Mattson, 1904–11
 Jacob P. Uhler, acting president 1911–1913, 1927
 Oscar J. "O.J." Johnson, 1913–42
 Walter Lunden, 1942–43
 O.A. Winfield, acting president 1943–44
 Edgar M. Carlson, 1944–1968
 Albert Swanson, acting president 1968–69
 Frank Barth, 1969–75
 Edward A. Lindell, 1975–80
 Abner W. Arthur, acting president 1980–81
 John S. Kendall, 1981–91
 Axel D. Steuer, 1991–2002
 Dennis J. Johnson, interim president 2002–03
 James L. Peterson, 2003–08
 Jack R. Ohle, 2008–14
 Rebecca M. Bergman, 2014–present

Academics 
The Gustavus Adolphus College curriculum aims to "prepare students for fulfilling lives of leadership and service in society." Students choose from over 70 programs of study with 75 majors in 25 academic departments and three interdisciplinary programs (including 17 honors majors), ranging from physics to religion to Scandinavian studies. Gustavus has been among the top 10 liberal-arts institutions nationally as the baccalaureate origin of physics PhDs. The college has 170 faculty, of whom 94% are tenure-track. The student-to-faculty ratio is 11:1, creating an average class size of approximately 15. The college's Writing Across the Curriculum program fosters writing skills in all academic disciplines. Since 1983, the college has had a chapter of the academic honor society Phi Beta Kappa. Its most popular majors, by 2021 graduates, were:
Psychology (66)
Biology/Biological Sciences (52)
Business/Commerce (43)
Speech Communication and Rhetoric (36)
Education (31)
Political Science and Government (30)
English Language and Literature (29)
Registered Nursing/Registered Nurse (29)
Sports, Kinesiology, and Physical Education/Fitness(27)

Gustavus Adolphus College alumni have won Fulbright, Goldwater, Marshall, Rhodes, Truman, National Science Foundation, and NCAA Postgraduate fellowships and scholarships.

In 2015, the college successfully applied for the voluntary Carnegie classification of "community-engaged".

Rankings

In 2017, Gustavus was ranked 77th in the national liberal arts college category and 45th in the Best Value Schools category by U.S. News & World Report.

The Wall Street Journal/Times Higher Education college rankings placed Gustavus 48th on its list of the top 100 liberal arts colleges in the United States in 2017, third among Minnesota private colleges. Gustavus placed 140th out of 1,061 institutions measured, including public and private colleges.

The 2016 edition of the Washington Monthly college rankings placed Gustavus 58th among liberal arts colleges.

In 2016, Gustavus ranked 74th of 705 colleges and universities in Money magazine. The college also ranked 23rd on the magazine's list of the 50 Best Liberal Arts Colleges.

The New York Times ranked Gustavus No. 35 in the United States in their third annual College Access Index of Top Colleges in 2017.

Admissions 
In 2016, U.S. News & World Report classified Gustavus Adolphus College as more selective in its National Liberal Arts Ranking. To increase student enrollment, Gustavus offers an expenses-paid "Gustavus Fly-In Program" to US citizens and permanent residents. In 2014, the school had an acceptance rate of 61.1%.

The average ACT score in the middle 50% of enrolled students was between 24 and 30; 78% of students presented the ACT as part of their applications. The average SAT score in the middle 50% of enrolled students was 590–680 for math and 555–690 for reading; 11% of students submitted the SAT as part of their applications. Gustavus is a test-optional admissions policy college, reaffirming its commitment to holistic admissions. A student's coursework is the most important factor in admission. The average high school GPA for incoming freshmen was 3.67.

In 2017, Gustavus expanded scholarship funding for high-achieving students with a cumulative high school grade point average of 3.9 or above and an average composite ACT score of 32–36.

Campus

The college's first building in St. Peter, affectionately known as Old Main, originally housed the entire college. The campus, known as The Hill, comprises 340 landscaped acres and features science facilities, computer and language labs, and a large dining facility. The campus includes 33 sculptures by the late Minnesota sculptor Paul Granlund, an alumnus of the college who for many years was sculptor-in-residence.

Every tree indigenous to Minnesota is grown in The Arboretum at Gustavus. In 2009 students founded Big Hill Farm, which grows produce for the cafeteria and aims to connect the campus to sustainable agriculture. In the fall of 2011, a new social science center, Beck Hall, opened on campus.

Notable buildings

 Folke Bernadotte Memorial Library
 Alfred Nobel Hall of Science
 O.J. Johnson Student Union
 Lund Center (Athletic complex featuring Gus Young Court and Don Roberts Ice Arena)
 Hillstrom Museum of Art, notable for its collection of American art from the Ashcan School
 The Arboretum at Gustavus Adolphus College
 "Old Main" – National Register of Historic Places
 C. Charles Jackson Campus Center
 Over thirty Paul Granlund sculptures

Old Main
"Old Main" was the first building erected at Gustavus Adolphus College. Its cornerstone was laid on August 12, 1875. Contracted to O. N. Ostrom and constructed from Kasota limestone, the total cost of the building was estimated at $25,000. Old Main was completed in 1876 and dedicated on October 31 of that year. Originally called the School Building, as more buildings were erected it became known as the Main Building and by 1905 as Old Main.

The building was heated by wood stoves and housed the entire college in the institution's first years. It originally contained several classrooms and sleeping quarters for students, faculty, and the president as well as a kitchen, dining room, chapel, library, and museum. Until 1920, it was tradition for seniors to gather on the building's roof for a sunrise breakfast the morning of commencement.

On its 50th anniversary in 1926, Old Main underwent a renovation from funds provided by the Minnesota Conference. The 1998 tornado, which destroyed much of the Gustavus campus, damaged Old Main's bell tower. In 2005 another renovation was completed; the building now houses the Office of the Chaplains and the religion, political science, philosophy, and classics departments.

A popular ghost story surrounding Old Main is the tale told by former Chaplain Richard Elvee of two deceased Gustavus security officers, Harley and Barney, occasionally wandering its halls while he composed his sermons on Sunday mornings.

Christ Chapel
Christ Chapel is a church in the center of Gustavus Adolphus College. Constructed from March 2, 1959, to fall 1961, the chapel was dedicated on January 7, 1962. Its construction was made possible by gifts from the congregations of the Lutheran Augustana Synod, a predecessor body of the Evangelical Lutheran Church in America, which is affiliated with the college. Ecumenical services are held each weekday and on Sundays during the academic year. There is seating for 1,500 people in the chapel, 1,200 on the main floor and 300 in the balcony. It is the largest seating area on campus.

The chapel and surrounding grounds are adorned by the sculptures of Paul T. Granlund, the former artist-in-residence at Gustavus Adolphus College.

Christ Chapel's organ was originally built by Hillgreen-Lane when the Chapel was built. It has been significantly altered in the last 30 years. These renovations, carried out by David Engen and more recently by the Hendrickson Organ Company of St. Peter, include a new console with solid-state combination and relay, moving several ranks of pipes from an antiphonal position in the basement into the main organ above the balcony, restructuring the Swell mixture, and extensive repairs after the 1998 tornado. It has 55 speaking ranks of pipes, played from a four-manual console, and a preparation on the new Great chest for a mounted Kornet V stop. The Chapel also houses a small portative organ of three stops on one manual that is used for accompanying and especially for continuo playing in Baroque compositions.

On March 29, 1998, the chapel's spire was toppled by the tornado that left most of St. Peter, Minnesota, in ruins. On March 17, 2008, the cross that had been atop the spire was hung from the chapel's ceiling during a service marking the 10-year anniversary of the tornado.

Disasters 
 On January 8, 1970, the Auditorium was completely gutted by a fire, after which it was not rebuilt.
 On March 29, 1998, the college's campus was hit by a mile-wide F3 tornado that broke 80 percent of the windows, leveled nearly 2,000 trees, toppled the chapel's spire, and caused more than $50 million in damages. This is considered one of the most expensive college disasters in history. There was only one death (not a Gustavus student) despite the tornado's widespread path, most likely because most students were away on spring break at the time. Hundreds of volunteers worked to get the campus back into a condition where the students could return after a three-week hiatus. Still, some classes were held in FEMA trailers as some campus buildings were too severely damaged.

Campus life

Students and alumni of the college are known as Gusties. Most students live in 14 residence halls on campus or in college-owned houses/apartments; a small minority live in theme areas such as the Carlson International Center, CHOICE substance-free housing, and the Swedish House. Students with permission from the college may choose to live off campus, in St. Peter or elsewhere.

The college has an independently operated dining service, serving the Market Place cafeteria and Courtyard Cafe.

Traditions 
Gustavus traditions include traying down the hill from Old Main in the winter, random Gustie Rousers, stargazing on top of the academic building Olin, playing tennis in the Bubble, and streaking through The Arboretum at Gustavus. Gustie traditions are mostly exclusively known by Gusties.

Student organizations 
There are more than 120 special interest groups and organizations at Gustavus. Students are very engaged on campus. Active student organizations on campus have included Model United Nations, the National Forensics Debate team, and the Gustavian Society of Filmmakers. Students are encouraged to create their own clubs or teams and apply to Student Senate for funding.

Nearly 1/5 of students are active in Greek life at Gustavus. There are ten recognized Greek organizations on campus (some have been suspended and are no longer recognized by the college).

One prominent campus organization is the Campus Activities Board (CAB). CAB's mission statement is to "enrich the campus life experience by encouraging the involvement of all students in entertainment that is engaging and enjoyable." All students on campus are part of the Campus Activities Board and eligible to participate in activities, serve on committees, and apply for the Executive Board. There are 11 executive positions, not including the co-presidents and the advisor.

Music 
Many musical ensembles perform throughout the year, including the Gustavus Choir, the Choir of Christ Chapel, the Lucia Singers, the Gustavus Adolphus Symphony Orchestra, Gustavus Wind Orchestra, Gustavus Jazz Ensemble, etc.

In 1942, Percy Grainger, writing in The Musical Quarterly, publicized the "pathbreaking activities"—as an historically appropriate ensemble—of the college's A Capella Choir and chamber orchestra, which toured a series of concerts of music from the 13th to 20th centuries. He praised the "rare value", "practical skill" and "subtle esthetic intuition" of conductor G. Adolph Nelson.

Grainger had an opportunity to observe the work of Nelson, the choir and orchestra at close quarters by touring and performing with them that year. Nelson was the college's musical director from 1930 to 1945 and the driving force behind a group that toured the eastern states, winning both critical acclaim and financial success. He was particularly concerned to revive and share the music of the chapel, including not just voices but also the instruments that supported them, including organ, brass and strings. "Nelson, through his dedication to choral singing and to Gustavus Adolphus College, his innate musicality, and his pioneering spirit, gave birth to the ensemble now known as the Gustavus Choir."

Theatre and dance 
Gustavus has a very active theatre program. Theater and dance events are a vibrant part of Gustie life, with shows every fall and spring and a musical every other year. Students do not need to be a part of the theatre program to audition for plays. The Gustavus Dance Company and the Apprentice Company hold open auditions and perform a fully produced set of work.

Art 
There are two art galleries on campus, the Hillstrom Museum of Art and the Schaefer Art Gallery.

Study abroad

The college's study abroad program has included internships at BNU-HKBU United International College in Zhuhai, China. Gustavus is also a member of the Intercollegiate Sri Lanka Education (ISLE) consortium, run by Bowdoin College.

Athletics
Gustavus is a founding member of the Minnesota Intercollegiate Athletic Conference, MIAC. Key sports at the college are tennis, swimming & diving, golf, basketball, ice hockey, football, and soccer. The school's team name is the Golden Gusties, represented by a lion mascot because Gustavus Adolphus was known as "The Lion of the North." Gustavus has had three players drafted in the NFL Draft: Russ Buckley in 1940, Kurt Ploeger in 1985, and Ryan Hoag in 2003. On March 26, 2014, Gustavus announced it would not continue its men's and women's Nordic skiing team.

Varsity sports 

-The Gustavus women's softball team placed third in the NCAA Division III national tournament in 2009. 

-The Gustavus men's hockey team placed second in the NCAA Division III national tournament in 2009. 

-The Gustavus soccer team finished second in the NCAA Division III national tournament in 2005—led in part by three-time all-American Robert "Bobby" Kroog. 

-In 2003 the Gustavus men's basketball team finished second in the NCAA Division III national tournament. 

-In the middle of the twentieth century, the Gustavus football team was coached by long-time coach/AD Moose Malmquist. 

-The women's hockey team has won seven conference titles, including six straight, and has placed in the top four nationally in 2002, 2005, 2006 and 2010. They won the 2023 Division 3 National Championship with a 2-1 victory over Amherst College. Five women alumni who played ice hockey at Gustavus have gone on to represent the United States at the 2016 Women's Bandy World Championship, and one represents the Unified Korean team at the 2018 Winter Olympics.

-The Gustavus men's tennis team have made 11 consecutive appearances at the NCAA Division III National Championships. Gustavus Adolphus College hosted the 2013 USTA/ITA Midwest Regional Championships at the Swanson Indoor Tennis Center and Brown Outdoor Courts in St. Peter, Minnesota. In 2003 Steve Wilkinson's squad placed third at the NCAA Division III Championships as well as a first-place finish at the ITA Indoor Championships. Steve Wilkinson retired in 2009 as the winningest coach in college tennis history with a record of 929–279. Gustavus player Eric Butorac, closed out his senior season of 2003 by winning both the NCAA Division III singles and doubles championships, with Kevin Whipple as his partner. In 2003, Eric Butorac turned pro. He was a doubles specialist before retiring in 2016 and achieved success being the no. 3 ranked American doubles player for multiple years before retiring.

Directors' Cup

Gustavus placed 81st in the 2018–19 Learfield Sports Directors' Cup standings. The Directors' Cup is the only all-sports competition in intercollegiate athletics. In Division III, standings are based on national tournament finishes in 18 sports. In 2002–03 Gustavus placed a school-best 6th in the Directors' Cup standings.

Media
Gustavus Adolphus College is home to several publications and broadcasters:
 The Gustavian Weekly, first published in 1920, is the campus newspaper. Its predecessor was the College Breezes. In addition, there were various other names for the student paper from June 1891 into 1902.
 Firethorne is an arts and literary magazine published twice per year. Students submit short stories, poetry, creative nonfiction, photography, visual art, or other creative content.
 KGSM is a webcast-only radio station operated entirely by students. The studio moved to the Beck Academic Hall in 2011 to improve the quality of its webstream and added a digital audio workstation.
 The newest campus media outlet is GAC TV. Started by a group of students interested in bringing television broadcasting to campus, GAC TV became an instant success when students started watching the weekly show before free on-campus films.
 The Gustavian yearbook publishes a yearbook for each class and dates back to 1920 with predecessor publications released under different names dating back to 1904.
  TV broadcasts from Gustavus are released over Internet II.
  An alumni magazine, the Gustavus Quarterly, features articles of interest to graduates.

Notable alumni

Academics 
 George Lindbeck, Yale University Professor of Theology
James M. McPherson, Pulitzer Prize-winning historian, author of the seminal Civil War monograph Battle Cry of Freedom
 Paul D. Hanson, Harvard professor, archaeologist, and writer
 Douglas O. Linder, University of Missouri-Kansas City Professor of Law
 Roy Andrew Miller, linguist, Yale University professor
 Hope A. Olson, University of Wisconsin–Milwaukee professor and library scholar
Sydney Ahlstrom, Yale University professor of religious history.

Arts and entertainment, journalists, writers 

 Kurt Elling, Grammy Award-winning jazz vocalist
 David Esbjornson, theatre director, worked on debut plays by Arthur Miller, Edward Albee, and Tony Kushner (world premiere of Angels in America: Millennium Approaches). Artistic Director of Seattle Repertory Theatre.
 Steve Heitzeg, Emmy Award-winning composer
 Paul Granlund, sculptor
 Bill Holm, poet and writer
 Kevin Kling, actor and writer
 Peter Krause, American film and television actor
 Steve Zahn, actor
 Dennie Gordon, film director
 Allison Rosati, news anchor for WMAQ-TV in Chicago
 Ryan Hoag, 2003 Mr. Irrelevant and former Bachelorette contestant
Lyz Lenz, 2005, journalist and author

Business 
 Luther Luedtke, CEO of Education Development Center and former President of California Lutheran University
 Patsy O'Connell Sherman, co-inventor of 3M Scotchgard

Politics and public service 
 Adolph Olson Eberhart, Minnesota Governor (1909–1915)
 Magnus Ranstorp, internationally renowned expert on terrorism and counter-terrorism.
 Theodore C. Almquist, U.S. Air Force Brigadier General
 G. Barry Anderson, Associate Justice of the Minnesota Supreme Court (sworn into office 2004), Class of 1976
 John Anderson, Wisconsin State Senator
 Joanell Dyrstad, Minnesota Lieutenant Governor (1991–1995)
 David Hann, former Republican leader in the Minnesota Senate
 Margaret Anderson Kelliher, former Speaker of the Minnesota House of Representatives
 Harold LeVander, Minnesota Governor (1967–1971)
 Paul A. Magnuson, Senior Judge, U.S. District Court for the District of Minnesota
 Luther Youngdahl, Governor of Minnesota (1947–1951) and Judge of the United States District Court for the District of Columbia (1951–1978)
 Norman Carlson, Director of Federal Bureau of Prisons (1970–1987), President of the American Correctional Association (ACA), University of Minnesota Professor of Sociology (1987–1998)
 Oscar Youngdahl, former member of U.S. House of Representatives.
 Jack Bergman, Lieutenant General, United States Marine Corps (Ret.), Congressman representing Michigan's 1st congressional district
 Mark W. Bennett, Judge, United States District Court for the Northern District of Iowa

Sports 
 Marissa Brandt, South Korean ice hockey player (known by her legal name in Minnesota, not her birth name, Park Yoon-jung)
 Eric Butorac, professional tennis player and 2011 Australian Open doubles semi-finalist
 Wendell Butcher, American football player
 Kurt Ploeger, professional football player
 Earl Witte, professional football player

Notable faculty
 Joyce Sutphen, American poet and Minnesota's Poet Laureate from 2011 to 2021
 Marcia Bunge, theologian and professor of Lutheran studies, researching children and childhood in religion and ethics
 Peg O'Connor, American philosopher and contributor to The New York Times and Psychology Today.

References

External links

 Official website

 
Scandinavian studies
Liberal arts colleges in Minnesota
Educational institutions established in 1862
Lutheranism in Minnesota
Education in Nicollet County, Minnesota
Buildings and structures in Nicollet County, Minnesota
Tourist attractions in Nicollet County, Minnesota
Private universities and colleges in Minnesota
1862 establishments in Minnesota
Gustavus Adolphus of Sweden